The International Institute of Tropical Forestry is a program of the United States Forest Service that was founded in 1939.  It is headquartered in Rio Piedras, Puerto Rico, on the grounds of the University of Puerto Rico's Agricultural Experimental Station. May 20, 2014 marked the Institute's 75th anniversary.

Background

Dr. Ariel E. Lugo has been the director since 1979.

Hurricane Irma and Maria severely disrupted the Institute's work.

Its headquarters building was designed by architect W. Ellis Groben.

Gallery

See also
 Frank H. Wadsworth

References

United States Forest Service
Forestry in the United States
Forestry in Puerto Rico